Aparaajitha is a 1977 Indian Malayalam-language film, directed by J. Sasikumar and produced by R. S. Prabhu. The film stars Prem Nazir, Sharada, Jayabharathi and Jayan. The film has musical score by A. T. Ummer.

Cast
 
Prem Nazir 
Sharada 
Jayabharathi 
Jayan 
Sukumari 
Adoor Bhasi 
Thikkurissy Sukumaran Nair 
Sreelatha Namboothiri 
Lalithasree 
M. G. Soman 
Meena 
Pala Thankam 
Vanchiyoor Radha

Soundtrack
The music was composed by A. T. Ummer and the lyrics were written by Sreekumaran Thampi.

References

External links
 

1977 films
1970s Malayalam-language films
Films directed by J. Sasikumar